The higher education system in India includes both private and public universities. Public universities are supported by the Government of India and the state governments, while private universities are mostly supported by various bodies and societies. Universities in India are recognized by the University Grants Commission (UGC), which draws its power from the University Grants Commission Act, 1956. In addition, 16 Professional Councils are established, controlling different aspects of accreditation and coordination. The types of universities controlled by the UGC include Central universities, State universities, Deemed universities and Private universities

In addition to the above universities, other institutions are granted the permission to autonomously award degrees, and while not called "university" by name, act as such. They usually fall under the administrative control of the Department of Higher Education. In official documents they are called "autonomous bodies", "university-level institutions", or even simply "other central institutions". Such institutes include:

 Indian Institutes of Technology (IITs) are a group of autonomous engineering, science, and management institutes with special funding and administration. The Institutes of Technology Act, 1961 lists twenty three IITs.
National Institutes of Technology (NITs) are a group of engineering, science, technology and management institutes with special funding and administration. They were established as "Regional Engineering Colleges" and upgraded in 2003 to national status and central funding. The latest act governing NITs is the National Institutes of Technology Act, 2007 which declared them Institutes of National Importance. It lists thirty one NITs.
Indian Institutes of Management (IIMs) are a group of business schools created by the Government of India. IIMs are registered Societies governed by their respective Board of Governors. The Department of Higher Education lists 19 IIMs.
 Indian Institutes of Information Technology (IIITs) are a group of autonomous information technology oriented institutes with special funding and administration. The Indian Institutes of Information Technology Act lists five central  and twenty public-private partnership IIITs.
 Schools of Planning and Architecture (SPAs) are a group of architecture  and planning schools established by Ministry of HRD, Government of India. All the SPAs are premier centrally funded institution.
 Indian Institutes of Science Education and Research (IISERs) are a group of seven premier institutes established by the Ministry of Human Resource Development, devoted to science education and research in basic sciences. They are broadly set on the lines of the Indian Institute of Science.
 All India Institutes of Medical Sciences (AIIMS) are a group of autonomous public medical colleges of higher education. As of 2020, these are 15 in number and are established by the Ministry of Health and Family Welfare.
 National Law Universities (NLU) are law schools established for the promotion of legal education and research. As of  2020, there are 22 NLUs in India regulated by the Ministry of Law and Justice and the Bar Council of India.
 Institutes of National Importance (INIs) are institutions which are set by an act of parliament. They receive special recognition and funding. The Department of Higher Education's list includes 95 institutions including all of AIIMSs, IITs, NITs, SPAs, IIITs and some others like NIMHANS,IISc, ISI etc. were also legally awarded the status. INIs are marked below with a hash (#).
Institute under State Legislature Act (IuSLAs) are autonomous higher education institutes established or incorporated by a State legislature Act. Institutes that are ‘under State Legislature Act’ enjoy academic status and privileges like State universities.

Government-Funded Institutes

See also
List of universities in India

References